Eric Greenwood (12 April 1967 – 14 January 2003) was a Costa Rican swimmer. He competed in three events at the 1988 Summer Olympics.

References

External links
 

1967 births
2003 deaths
Costa Rican male swimmers
Olympic swimmers of Costa Rica
Swimmers at the 1988 Summer Olympics
Place of birth missing
20th-century Costa Rican people